The 1921 Ohio State Buckeyes football team represented Ohio State University in the 1921 Big Ten Conference football season. The Buckeyes compiled a 5–2 record while outscoring opponents 110–14. The 14 points allowed came in Ohio State's only losses. The Buckeyes' 1921 loss to  remains their last loss to a team from the state of Ohio.

Schedule

Coaching staff
 John Wilce, head coach, ninth year

References

Ohio State
Ohio State Buckeyes football seasons
Ohio State Buckeyes football